The Cincinnati Kid is a 1965 American drama film directed by Norman Jewison. It tells the story of Eric "The Kid" Stoner, a young Depression-era poker player, as he seeks to establish his reputation as the best. This quest leads him to challenge Lancey "The Man" Howard, an older player widely considered to be the best, culminating in a climactic final poker hand between the two.

The script, adapted from Richard Jessup's novel of the same name, was written by Ring Lardner Jr. and Terry Southern; it was Lardner's first major studio work since his 1947 blacklisting as one of The Hollywood Ten. The film stars Steve McQueen in the title role and Edward G. Robinson as Howard. Director Jewison, who replaced Sam Peckinpah shortly after filming began, describes The Cincinnati Kid as his "ugly duckling" film. He considers it the film that allowed him to transition from the lighter comedic films he had previously been making and take on more serious films and subjects.

The film garnered mixed reviews from critics on its initial release; supporting actors Robinson and Joan Blondell earned award nominations for their performances.

Plot
In the 1930s Eric Stoner, nicknamed "The Kid", an up-and-coming poker player in New Orleans, hears that Lancey Howard, an old master of the game, is in town, and sees it as his chance to achieve recognition as the new king of five-card stud. But before the huge contest between Stoner and Howard, the latter arranges a tune-up game with wealthy, corrupt William Jefferson Slade. For a dealer, he secures the services of the Kid's friend, Shooter, renowned for his integrity. Howard wins $6,000 from Slade over a 30-hour game, angering Slade and wounding his pride. That night at Slade's home, he tries to bribe Shooter into cheating in the Kid's favor when the two players meet. Shooter declines, but Slade calls in Shooter's markers worth $12,000, and blackmails him by threatening to reveal damaging information about Shooter's sleazy wife, Melba. Shooter agonizes over his decision, having spent the last 25 years building a reputation for honesty. Eventually, however, he accedes to Slade's demands. Meantime, with the Kid's girl Christian visiting her parents, Melba tries to seduce him, even though she and Christian are close friends. Out of respect for Shooter, he rebuffs her and spends the day before the game with Christian at her family's farm.

Back in New Orleans the next day, the big game begins. At first, there are six players, including Howard and the Kid, with Shooter playing as he deals and another dealer, the popular Lady Fingers, relieving him whenever Shooter needs a break. In the first big confrontation between the Kid and Howard, the Kid is short $2,000 and Slade steps in to stake him. Several hours later, Howard busts a player called Pig, and the remaining players take a break. After the game resumes, Shooter bows out of competition but remains at the table as dealer only. Later, two more players, Yeller and Sokal, drop out. That leaves just Howard and the Kid. After a few unlikely wins, the Kid abruptly calls for a break and then privately confronts Shooter, who admits to being forced into cheating by Slade. The Kid insists he can win on his own and tells Shooter to deal straight or he will blow the whistle, destroying Shooter's reputation. Before the game resumes, Melba succeeds in seducing the Kid. Christian makes a surprise visit to the room, catches them after the fact, and walks out on the Kid.

When the game is called back into session, the Kid maneuvers to have Shooter replaced by Lady Fingers, claiming Shooter is ill. He then wins several major pots from Howard, who is visibly losing confidence. During the final hand though, Howard beats the Kid with a queen-high straight flush. The Kid turns over his cards, revealing a full house, aces full of tens. In the end, the Kid not only loses all his money, but is in hock to Howard for $5,000. Howard then chastises the Kid, telling him that he will always be "second best" as long as Howard is around. After departing the hotel, the Kid loses a penny pitch to the shoeshine boy he had beaten at the same game at the film's opening. Around the corner, he unexpectedly runs into Christian. They embrace.

Alternative versions
In some cuts, the film ends with a freeze-frame on Steve McQueen's face following his penny-pitching loss. Turner Classic Movies and the DVD feature the ending with Christian. Jewison wanted to end the film with the freeze-frame but was overruled by the producer.

The cockfight scene was cut by British censors.

Cast

Production
The Cincinnati Kid was filmed on location in New Orleans, Louisiana, a change from the original St. Louis, Missouri, setting of the novel. Spencer Tracy was originally cast as Lancey Howard, but ill health forced him to withdraw from the film. Sam Peckinpah was originally hired to direct; producer Martin Ransohoff fired him shortly after filming began for "vulgarizing the picture." Peckinpah's version was to be shot in black-and-white to give the film a 1930s period feel. Jewison scrapped the black-and-white footage, feeling it was a mistake to shoot a film with the red and black of playing cards in greyscale. He did mute the colors throughout, both to evoke the period and to help pop the card colors when they appeared.  Strother Martin said he was cast in the film but got fired after Jewison replaced Peckinpah.

The film features a theme song performed by Ray Charles, the Eureka Brass Band performing a second line parade, and a scene in Preservation Hall with Emma Barrett  (vocalist and pianist), Punch Miller (trumpet), Paul Crawford (trombone), George Lewis (clarinet), Cie Frazier (drums) and Allan Jaffe (helicon).

Notes on the game
 When reciting the rules, Shooter clearly states "no string bets", though players (including Howard) go on to make string bets during the game.
 The game is open stakes. This is unusual in modern times and almost never allowed in casinos, but permissible in home games and was common for the time period of the film.
 The unlikely nature of the final hand is discussed by Anthony Holden in his book Big Deal: A Year as a Professional Poker Player, "the odds against any full house losing to any straight flush, in a two-handed game, are 45,102,781 to 1", with Holden continuing that the odds against the particular final hand in the movie are astronomical (as both hands include 10s). Holden states that the chances of both such hands appearing in one deal are "a laughable" 332,220,508,619 to 1 (more than 332 billion to 1 against) and goes on: "If these two played 50 hands of stud an hour, eight hours a day, five days a week, the situation would arise about once every 443 years."  Nevertheless, the nature of probability is that even if something is possible, however unlikely, it nevertheless might happen, and therefore is certainly not an impossibility.  The movie reflects that truth - if something is possible, it may possibly happen whatever the odds. Despite Holden's statement, such a hand is exactly as likely to appear on the first day as it might be in the 222nd day of the 443rd year.

Release
The world premiere was held at the Saenger Theatre in New Orleans on October 15, 1965, with a nationwide release on October 27. On November 5 the film opened in Los Angeles.

Home media
The television premiere of The Cincinnati Kid occurred February 11, 1971 when it was broadcast on the CBS Thursday Night Movie. It was released on Region 1 DVD on May 31, 2005. The DVD features a commentary track by director Norman Jewison, commentary on selected scenes from Celebrity Poker Showdown hosts Phil Gordon and Dave Foley and The Cincinnati Kid Plays According to Hoyle, a promotional short featuring magician Jay Ose. A Blu-ray Disc was released on June 14, 2011.
With the release of the film on DVD, one modern reviewer said the film "is as hip now as when it was released in 1965" and another cited McQueen as "effortlessly watchable as the Kid, providing a masterclass in the power of natural screen presence over dialogue" and Robinson "simply fantastic."   Poker author Michael Wiesenberg calls The Cincinnati Kid "[o]ne of the greatest poker movies of all time."

Soundtrack

Reception

Critical response
Upon its 1965 release, The Cincinnati Kid was favorably reviewed by Variety which wrote "Martin Ransohoff has constructed a taut, well-turned-out production. In Steve McQueen he has the near-perfect delineator of the title role. Edward G. Robinson is at his best in some years as the aging, ruthless Lancey Howard...."  Howard Thompson of The New York Times called the film a "respectably packaged drama" that is "strictly for those who relish—or at least play—stud poker" and notes that the "film pales beside The Hustler, to which it bears a striking similarity of theme and characterization."  Time magazine also noted the similarities to The Hustler, saying "nearly everything about Cincinnati Kid is reminiscent" of that film, but falls short in the comparison, in part because of the subject matter:

Director Jewison can put his cards on the table, let his camera cut suspensefully to the players' intent faces, but a pool shark sinking a tricky shot into a side pocket undoubtedly offers more range. Kid also has a less compelling subplot. Away from the table, McQueen gambles on a blonde (Tuesday Weld) and on the integrity of his dealer pal, Karl Malden. Pressure comes from a conventionally vicious Southern gentleman (Rip Torn), whose pleasures include a Negro mistress, a pistol range adjacent to his parlor, and fixed card games. As Malden's wife, Ann-Margret spells trouble of another kind, though her naive impersonation of a wicked, wicked woman recalls the era when the femme fatale wore breastplates lashed together with spider web. By the time all the bets are in, Cincinnati Kid appears to hold a losing hand.

A retrospective review published by the New York State Writers Institute of the University at Albany also noted the similarities the film had to The Hustler, but in contrast said The Cincinnati Kids "stylized realism, dreamlike color, and detailed subplots give [the film] a dramatic complexity and self-awareness that The Hustler lacks."

Blondell was singled out for her performance as Lady Fingers with an award from the National Board of Review of Motion Pictures and a Golden Globe nomination for Best Supporting Actress. Motion Picture Exhibitor magazine nominated Robinson for its Best Supporting Actor Laurel Award.

See also
 List of American films of 1965

References
Notes

External links

 
 
 
 

1965 films
1965 drama films
American drama films
Films based on American novels
Films directed by Norman Jewison
Films set in New Orleans
Films set in the 1930s
Films shot in New Orleans
Metro-Goldwyn-Mayer films
Films about poker
Films with screenplays by Terry Southern
Films with screenplays by Ring Lardner Jr.
Films scored by Lalo Schifrin
Filmways films
Cockfighting in film
1960s English-language films
1960s American films